Visual Basic is a name for a family of programming languages from Microsoft. It may refer to:

 Visual Basic, the current version of Visual Basic launched in 2002 which runs on .NET
 Visual Basic (classic), the original Visual Basic supported from 1991–2008
 Embedded Visual Basic, the classic version geared toward embedded applications
 Visual Basic for Applications, an implementation of Visual Basic 6 built into programs such as Microsoft Office and used for writing macros
 VBScript, an Active Scripting language